Puerto Jiménez Airport  is an airport serving Puerto Jiménez, a Gulf of Dulce coastal town in Puntarenas Province, Costa Rica. The airport is just east of the town. It is owned and managed by the country's Directorate General of Civil Aviation (DGAC).

Given the distance between Puerto Jiménez and the capital city of San José, the airport is the first choice for tourists traveling to Corcovado National Park and Golfo Dulce.

Airlines and destinations

Passenger Statistics

As of 2014, Puerto Jiménez Airport is the third-busiest airport in Costa Rica by passenger traffic and the busiest domestic-only airport. These data show number of passengers movements into the airport, according to the Directorate General of Civil Aviation of Costa Rica's Statistical Yearbooks.

See also
Transport in Costa Rica
List of airports in Costa Rica

References

External links
OurAirports - Puerto Jimenez Airport

Airports in Costa Rica
Buildings and structures in Puntarenas Province